Shie-Ming Peng (born 2 March 1949) is a Taiwanese chemist.

Peng attended National Hsinchu Senior High School and graduated from National Taiwan University prior to completing a doctorate from the University of Chicago. He returned to teach at NTU in 1976, after two years as a postdoctoral researcher at Northwestern University. Peng was granted a Humboldt Fellowship in 1983, elected a member of Academia Sinica in 1998, and became a Fellow of the Royal Society of Chemistry in 2009.

References

1949 births
Living people
Taiwanese chemists
Academic staff of the National Taiwan University
National Taiwan University alumni
University of Chicago alumni
20th-century Taiwanese scientists
21st-century Taiwanese scientists
20th-century chemists
21st-century chemists
Fellows of the Royal Society of Chemistry
Members of Academia Sinica